The Surface Studio is an all-in-one PC, designed and produced by Microsoft as part of its Surface series of Windows-based personal computing devices. It was announced at the Windows 10 Devices Event on October 26, 2016, with pre-orders beginning that day.

The first desktop computer to be manufactured entirely by Microsoft, the Surface Studio uses the Windows 10 operating system with the Anniversary Update preinstalled. However, it is optimized for the Windows 10 Creators Update, which was released on April 11, 2017. The product, starting at $2,999, is aimed primarily at people in creative professions such as graphic artists and designers.

Two years later, in October 2018, Microsoft announced its successor, the Surface Studio 2.

Features

Hardware
The Surface Studio has a 28-inch 4.5K "PixelSense" display with 4500 x 3000 pixels, equivalent to 192 dpi. The screen, the thinnest ever built for an all-in-one PC at 12.5 millimetres thick, is capable of being used in both the DCI-P3 and sRGB color spaces, and features a unique hinge design that allows it be tilted to a flat position, in a manner similar to the Wacom Cintiq. The bezel of the display contains a 5.0 megapixel camera and a Windows Hello-compatible backlit infrared camera.

The CPU is located in the base. Its compact design contains a 6th generation (codename "Skylake") Intel Core i5 or Core i7 processor and either a NVIDIA GeForce GTX 965M or GeForce GTX 980M graphics processor (both dependent on configuration). The system can be configured with up to 32 GB of DDR4 RAM and a 2 terabyte hard drive. It also features four USB 3.0 ports, a Mini DisplayPort, an SDXC card reader and a headset connection.

Unlike many desktop PCs, the Surface Studio supports Microsoft's Modern Standby (formerly known as InstantGo) specification, enabling background tasks to operate while the computer is sleeping. A firmware update was released in April 2017 that enabled Cortana to be summoned via a "Hey, Cortana" voice command from sleep, provided the Studio is running the Creators Update.

Accessories
Microsoft specially designed its Surface Mouse and Surface Keyboard to work with the Surface Studio. It is also compatible with the Surface Pen and a newly created accessory, the Surface Dial. The latter consists of a round disk that can be placed on the display and rotated to perform various actions, such as scrolling, zooming, adjusting the volume, among others, with precision. Developers can utilize its APIs to integrate its functionality into their own products.

Reception
The Surface Studio received generally positive reviews from technology critics. Many praised the large high resolution display, with Tom Warren of The Verge calling it "truly one of the best desktop monitors I’ve ever used". There was also praise for the design and build quality. Criticisms included the high entry price of the device, the all rear-facing I/O ports and the use of last generation Intel CPUs and Nvidia GPUs.

Timeline

References

External links
 
  

Microsoft Surface
All-in-one desktop computers